K. Krishnan Warrier is a Communist Party of India politician from Thrissur City. He was the Member of Parliament from Thrissur Lok Sabha constituency, Kerala, in 1957 and 1962.

References

Politicians from Thrissur
India MPs 1957–1962
India MPs 1962–1967
Lok Sabha members from Kerala
Communist Party of India politicians from Kerala